Lepidosaphes beckii also known as purple scale, mussel scale, citrus mussel scale, orange scale, comma scale and mussel purple scale is a scale insect that is a pest of Citrus trees. The small insects attach themselves to leaves, fruits and small branches and cause injury by sucking the tree's sap.

The specific name beckii is in honour of historian Richard Beck.

Description
Lepidosaphes beckii was originally described under the name Coccus beckii by English entomologist Edward Newman from a fruit imported to Great Britain. Newman's original description reads as follows:

The adult female citrus mussel scale is up to three millimetres long.

Host plants

These are usually Citrus host plant species such as sweet orange Citrus × sinensis.

Predators
Predators of Lepidosaphes beckii include chalcid wasps from families Aphelinidae, Encyrtidae and Signiphoridae:

 Aphelinidae: Aphytis chrysomphali, Aphytis diaspidis, Aphytis holoxanthus, Aphytis lepidosaphes, Aphytis mytilaspidis, Encarsia citrina, Encarsia lounsburyi, Eretmocerus corni and Pteroptrix chinensis
 Encyrtidae: Adelencyrtus inglisiae, Metaphycus flavus and Ooencyrtus sp.
 Signiphoridae: Signiphora flavopalliata and Signiphora merceti

References
This article incorporates public domain text from the reference

External links

 photos of Lepidosaphes beckii

Lepidosaphidini
Agricultural pest insects
Taxa named by Edward Newman
Citrus pests
Insects described in 1869
Hemiptera of Asia